Kid 'n Play is a 1990 animated cartoon series based on the real life hip-hop duo, Kid 'n Play. It ran for one season on NBC from September 8 to December 8, 1990. On the show, Kid 'n Play were portrayed as teenagers, along with their friend Jazzy, their producer Hurbie and their DJ Wiz, but their recording careers remained the same as in real life, as did their character traits. Production was by Marvel Productions and Saban Entertainment.

The real Kid 'n Play appeared in live-action wraparounds of the cartoons, but voice actors took over for the animated versions of the duo. The show stressed positive role models, teaching children how to get along with each other and stay out of trouble. Akin to the House Party films, Play was the less responsible member of the duo, cooking up get rich quick schemes, while Kid, the more responsible member, would usually be made to clean up messes. Oftentimes the issue would be resolved by the characters' girlfriends, or sometimes by an elderly jazz musician who wore a blue beret and was aptly named "Old Blue". Also along the crew is Kid's Mohawk pet dog Hairy. The lessons ranged from serious to lighter fare. One of the "less serious" episodes dealt with Kid's father under the impression hip hop is bad and Kid not having the means to put it in a positive light. Old Blue offers to help by sending Kid on a trip back in time to the era of jazz and 1920s speakeasies to help better understand its roots.

Marvel Comics published a tie-in comic book which ran for nine issues in 1992.

The series was created by John Semper Jr. and Cynthia Friedlob who also served as the show-runners and head-writers. They would later go on to write Kid 'N Play's third live-action feature, Class Act, for Warner Bros. Semper would later produce and be the head-writer for "Spider-Man: The Animated Series," for Marvel Films Animation.

Ownership of the series passed to Disney in 2001 when Disney acquired Fox Kids Worldwide, which also includes Marvel Productions. But the series is not available on Disney+.

Cast
 Christopher Reid as himself (live-action segments)
 Christopher Martin as himself (live-action segments)
Salt N Pepa as themselves (live-action segments)
Kool Moe Dee as himself (live-action segments)
Tony! Toni! Tone! as themselves (live-action segments)
DJ Spinderella as herself (live-action segments)

Voices
 Jack Angel
 Tommy Davidson as Jazzy, Acorn
 Chris Hooks as Christopher Reid
 J. D. Hall as Pitbull, Mr. Reid
 Dorian Harewood as Old Blue
 Martin Lawrence as Wiz, Hurbie
 Dawnn Lewis as Lela
 Brian Stokes Mitchell as Christopher Martin
 Danny Mann as Hairy
 Rain Pryor as B.B.
 Alaina Reed
 Terri Semper
 Cree Summer as Marika, Downtown, Carrie

Additional voices
 Charlie Adler
 Susan Blu
 Tom McHugh
 Rob Paulsen
 Les Tremayne
 Janet Waldo
 Patric Zimmerman

Episodes

References

External links
 
 
Kid 'n Play Season 1 Playlist

1990s American black cartoons
1990 American television series debuts
1990 American television series endings
NBC original programming
Marvel Comics titles
American children's animated comedy television series
1990s American animated television series
Cultural depictions of American men
Cultural depictions of hip hop musicians
Black people in art
Animation based on real people
Television series based on singers and musicians
Comics based on television series
English-language television shows
Television series by Marvel Productions
Television series by Saban Entertainment
American television series with live action and animation